I See Good Spirits and I See Bad Spirits is the first studio album by the band My Life With The Thrill Kill Kult. It was released in 1988 via Wax Trax!

The band's sound was initially an amalgam of heavy dance rhythms, horror film sampling, and quasi-Satanic imagery. Their early recordings were extremely popular in industrial dance clubs. A music video was released for the song, "...And This is What the Devil Does!", and appears on The Kult Kollection DVD. In 2004, the album was remastered and reissued with three bonus tracks, featuring two live tracks recorded on October 28, 1988, at The Riviera, Chicago.

Critical reception
Trouser Press wrote that "the dreary mix of electronic atmospherics, vaguely ominous chants, disco beats and B-movie samples aspires to sleaziness but never breaks (out in) a sweat."

Track listing
All tracks composed by Thrill Kill Kult and The Bomb Gang Girls

References

External links

My Life with the Thrill Kill Kult albums
1988 debut albums
Wax Trax! Records albums